Mpererwe is a neighborhood in the city of Kampala, Uganda's capital city. Sometimes it is spelled as Mpereerwe.

Location
Mpererwe is in Kawempe Division in northern Kampala. It is bordered by Katalemwa in Wakiso District to the north, Kisaasi to the east, Kanyanya to the south, and Kawempe to the west. The coordinates of Mpererwe are 0°22'55.0"N 32°34'31.0"E (Latitude:0.381950; Longitude:32.575275).

Overview
Mpererwe is a trading centre that is gradually turning into a busy commercial area. Schools, gas stations, small-scale factories, hospitals, and a cinema hall are in this neighborhood. In up to 50 percent of homes, backyard urban agriculture is practiced. Because of the rapid urbanisation rate coupled with high unemployment, particularly among young people, the area is prone to crime. Despite those challenges, the neighborhood remains close-knit, with a modest cost of living compared to other areas of the city.

Points of interest
These points of interest are located within Mpererwe or near its borders:
 Mpererwe Church of Uganda Primary School - A mixed, day, elementary school, affiliated with the Church of Uganda
 St. Stephen's Mpererwe Hospital - A private 100-bed community hospital affiliated with the Church of Uganda
 Katalemwa Cheshire Home - A rehabilitation center for children with severe orthopaedic, spinal and mental disabilities. Operated under contract by the Good Samaritan Sisters, under the supervision of the Roman Catholic Archdiocese of Kampala.
 Kampala Capital City Authority Landfill - located at Kiteezi, near Mpererwe
 Faikha Senior Secondary School - A private, non-residential secondary school (S1-S4), affiliated with the Islamic Faith

See also
 Kampala Capital City Authority
 Kampala District
 Central Region, Uganda
 Uganda National Roads Authority
 Kampala–Gayaza Road

References

External links
 Detailed Demarcation of Kampala City Divisions
  Kampala's Garbage Problem

Neighborhoods of Kampala
Cities in the Great Rift Valley
Kawempe Division